Theodoros Velkos (Greek: Θεόδωρος Βέλκος; born 20 November 1976) is a male badminton player from Greece.

Velkos competed in badminton at the 2004 Summer Olympics in men's doubles with partner George Patis.  They were defeated in the 32nd round by Chan Chong Ming and Chew Choon Eng of Malaysia. In his home country he won 12 titles at the Greek National Badminton Championships until 2010.

He had previously competed as Todor Velkov, representing Bulgaria at the 1996 Summer Olympics.

References

External links
Theodoros Velkos at Sports Reference
Todor Velkov at Sports Reference

Bulgarian male badminton players
Greek male badminton players
Badminton players at the 1996 Summer Olympics
Badminton players at the 2004 Summer Olympics
Olympic badminton players of Greece
Olympic badminton players of Bulgaria
1976 births
Living people